The 1953 Soviet Class B was the fourth season in Soviet Class B and 14th in second tier. It involved a participation of 27 teams. Started on May 2, it continued to September 27, 1953.

FC Dinamo Minsk has won the competition.

The competition consisted of two stages. At the first stage, teams were split in three groups playing each other home-away double round-robin tournament. At the second stage, teams played with their counterparts from other two groups however the top two teams from each group formed the first pool which was the only one consisting of 6 teams, while other consisted of 3 teams.

Teams

Relegated teams
Four teams were relegated from the 1952 Soviet Class A (top tier).
 VVS Moscow (return after a six-year absence)
 FC Daugava Riga (return after a four-year absence)
 FC Shakhter Donetsk (return after a four-year absence)
 FC Dinamo Minsk (return after a year absence)

Promoted teams
 Torpedo Rostov-na-Donu – debut
 Zenit Kaliningrad – return after a three-year absence, Champion of the 1952 KFK competitions Russian SFSR (as "Zavod imeni Kalinina")
 Spartak Kalinin – return after a three-year absence
 Avangard Chelyabinsk – return after a two-year absence
 Krylia Sovetov Molotov – return after a three-year absence, placed 9th in the 1952 KFK competitions Russian SFSR (as "SC imeni Stalina")
 Avangard Sverdlovsk – return after a three-year absence
 KBF Tallinn – debut, Champion of the 1952 Estonian SSR Football Championship, replaced with Kalev Tallinn
 Metallurg Zaporozhye – return after a three-year absence, Champion of the 1952 Football Championship of the Ukrainian SSR
 Metallurg Dnepropetrovsk – return after a three-year absence
 Metallurg Odessa – debut, placed 8th in Group 3 of the 1952 Football Championship of the Ukrainian SSR 
 Spartaki Tbilisi – return after a three-year absence
 Gornyak Leninabad – debut
 Iskra Frunze – return after a year absence

Withdrawn teams
After death of Joseph Stalin, several teams that represented Soviet Armed Forces were dissolved on orders of Minister of Defense Nikolay Bulganin:
 VVS Moscow
 VMS Moscow – replaced with Khimik Moscow
 DO Tashkent – replaced with Spartak Tashkent
 DO Tbilisi – temporary
 DO Kiev – temporary
 DO Sverdlovsk

First stage

Zone I

Zone II

Zone III

Second stage

For places 1-6

Sep 13-27, Gorkiy

For places 7-9

For places 10-12
 
Sep 27 - Oct 1, Baku

For places 13-15

 Notes: Dinamo Alma-Ata withdrew.

For places 16-18
 
Sep 29 – Oct 3, Kishinev

For places 19-21
 
Sep 27 – Oct 1, Sverdlovsk

For places 22-24
 
Sep 26-29, Dnepropetrovsk

For places 25-27
 
Sep 25-29, Moskva

Number of teams by republics

See also
 1953 Soviet Class A
 1953 Soviet Cup

References

External links
 1953 at rsssf.com
 Season regulations. football.lg.ua
 БЕЗ СТАЛИНА (ЛЕТОПИСЬ Акселя ВАРТАНЯНА. 1953 год. Часть первая). www.sport-express.ru
 "УБИЙСТВО" В ПЕТРОВСКОМ ПАРКЕ (ЛЕТОПИСЬ Акселя ВАРТАНЯНА. 1953 год. Часть третья). www.sport-express.ru
 ОБУТЫЕ ПРОТИВ БОСОНОГИХ (ЛЕТОПИСЬ Акселя ВАРТАНЯНА. 1953 год. Часть четвертая). www.sport-express.ru
 РАЗОРВАННЫЕ КРУЖЕВА (ЛЕТОПИСЬ Акселя ВАРТАНЯНА. 1953 год. Часть пятая). www.sport-express.ru

1953
2
Soviet
Soviet